Singin' in the Corn is a 1946 American Comedy Western film directed by Del Lord and written by Isabel Dawn, Monte Brice, and Elwood Ullman. The film stars Judy Canova, Allen Jenkins, Guinn "Big Boy" Williams, Alan Bridge, Charles Halton and Robert Dudley. The film was released on December 26, 1946, by Columbia Pictures.

Plot

Cast

References

External links
 

1946 films
1940s English-language films
American Western (genre) comedy films
1940s Western (genre) comedy films
Columbia Pictures films
Films directed by Del Lord
American black-and-white films
1940s American films